The Moon and the Bonfires is an English translation of the novel La Luna e i Falò, by the Italian poet and novelist Cesare Pavese. The book was written in Italian in 1949. It is considered Pavese's best novel.

The first English language translation was undertaken by Louise Sinclair in 1952.  A more recent translation by R. W. Flint, published in 2002, uses the arguably more correct translation of The Moon and the Bonfires, taking account of the use of the plural i Falò in the original Italian title.

The novel is set in the small town of Santo Stefano Belbo, in Piedmont, north-west Italy. The protagonist, known only by his nickname of Anguilla (Eel), has returned to his home town in the years immediately following the Second World War. He left twenty-five years earlier and had made his fortune in the United States. Returning to his home town, he finds many of the same smells and sights that filled his youth, but he also finds a town and its inhabitants that have been deeply changed by war and by the passage of time.

Awards and honors
In 2003, R.W. Flint's translation won the PEN Translation Prize.

In 2016, The New York Review of Books and The Guardian named The Moon and the Bonfires one of the best books of the year.

Adaptation
The Moon and the Bonfires was one of two Pavese novels (the other being Dialoghi con Leucò) to be adapted by Danièle Huillet and Jean-Marie Straub as part of their 1979 film From the Clouds to the Resistance.

See also

References

External links 

 The Moon And The Bonfire on Archive.org 
 Encyclopedia.com page
 Brittanica page on Cesare Pavese
 Brittanica page on the Hermetic movement in Italian literature

1949 novels
20th-century Italian novels
Novels set in Italy
Piedmont
Giulio Einaudi Editore books